Li Rui may refer to:

 Li Rui (footballer) (born 1994), Chinese footballer
 Li Rui (hurdler) (born 1979), retired female hurdler
 Li Rui (mathematician) (1768–1817), Chinese mathematician
 Li Rui (politician) (1917–2019), Chinese politician
 Li Rui (sport shooter), Chinese sport shooter at events such as the 2010 Asian Games
 Li Rui (writer) (born 1949), short-story writer and novelist

Li, Rui